Columbia Township Auditorium, also known as Township Auditorium, is a historic auditorium located in Columbia, South Carolina. It was built in 1930 (92 years ago), and is a three-story, brick building with a Doric order columned portico in the Georgian Revival style.  It was added to the National Register of Historic Places in 2005, and in 2009 it underwent a complete renovation/modernization that saw the architects/facility win national awards for historic preservation/renovation. The auditorium has a seating capacity of 3,072 for standard concert seating and 3,383 with general admission floor seating.

In the early years of the building the facility was a major tour stop in the Southeast USA with everyone performing there including Duke Ellington, The Ink Spots r&b group in '40, Louis Armstrong in '40 (for $1.20 a ticket) and '44, Count Basie & His Orchestra in '47, Elvis Presley in '56, Bill Haley & His Comets with Bo Diddley in '56, Florida's Ray Charles in '60, The Isley Brothers in '60, Johnny Cash in '63, Peter, Paul, & Mary in '63, Augusta's James Brown in '65, Macon's Otis Redding (d.1967) with Atlanta's Gladys Knight in '65, Beach Boys in '65, Greenwood's frat rock Swingin' Medallions in '66, Paul Revere & The Raiders in '67, Joan Baez in '68, and Loretta Lynn, just to name a few. Through the 70s and 80s the building was a major part of the success and growth of professional wrestling in the US. Pink Floyd played there in '72, Bruce Springsteen played there in '78, The Jacksons performed there in '79, Bob Seger played there in 1984, Blue Öyster Cult in '79, The Clash in '84, Athens' R.E.M. in '86, the Beastie Boys in '87, Red Hot Chili Peppers in '89, Blues Traveler played there in '92 and '97, The Smashing Pumpkins (3 times: in 1994, 2000, and 2007), Phish in '94 (Trey Anastasio has returned twice with his solo band in '01 and '05), Toad the Wet Sprocket in '95, Virginia's Dave Matthews in '97 and '99, Live in '99, Godsmack in '04, Alicia Keys in '05, Train in '06, and Switchfoot in '07. In 2010, Tony Bennett performed at the reopening of the Township. Although the building always had popularity, since the renovation the building has had more major shows come through like Jason Isbell, Cake in 2012, Rise Against with Florida's A Day to Remember in 2012, John Legend, Charlotte's K-Ci & JoJo and Anthony Hamilton, Mary J. Blige, Bob Dylan (6 times), ZZ Top, Pretty Lights, Stone Temple Pilots with Chester Bennington (d.2017) in '13, Charleston's Band Of Horses in '13, Willie Nelson, Merle Haggard, Jack White in 2014, Queens of the Stone Age in 2014, Skrillex in '14, Amos Lee, Alison Krauss, Greensboro's Daughtry, Charlotte's Avett Brothers in 2015, Rob Thomas (raised in Lake City, SC) in '15, John Mellencamp in 2015, Raleigh's Ryan Adams in 2009 and 2017, Modest Mouse in 2018, Upstate SC band Needtobreathe in '19, Chicago in '19, Diana Ross in 2020, a rap concert with Ja Rule, DMX, and Juvenile; the Atlanta rapper Future, Atlanta rap group Migos in '17, and Common in '19; and comedians Dave Chappelle in '04 and '20, Jerry Seinfeld in '05, Gabriel Iglesias in 2012, and Steve Martin with Martin Short in '21.  Also as a special honor when the legendary jam band Widespread Panic from Athens celebrated their 25th Anniversary Celebration, they picked the Township Auditorium as one of their favorite places to play. Widespread Panic played there in 2013, '15, and '16. Also the king of blues music BB King played one of his final shows at the building before he died in 2015. Author Pat Conroy from Beaufort also spoke at the Township two years before he died in 2016. Zedd's October 2015 concert (on the True Colors Tour) was cancelled due to the flooding of Columbia. Breaking Benjamin's 2018 concert was also cancelled. Shinedown's 2020 concert was cancelled due to COVID-19. Nelly's 2021 concert was cancelled. There were no concerts at The Township (due to COVID-19) from Jerry Seinfeld on March 7, 2020 until The Isley Brothers concert on September 10th, 2021. Earth, Wind & Fire performed there on Oct. 9. Atlanta's Collective Soul played at the Township with Better Than Ezra and Tonic on Oct. 7, 2021. Jeezy and Monica performed there in November 2021. KC & the Sunshine Band and Aaron Lewis of Staind performed there in April 2022. Charlotte-born George Clinton (funk musician) gave an interview there in June 2022, and R&B group Jodeci from Charlotte performed there in 2022. Ziggy Marley performed a tribute to his father in August 2022. South Carolina musicians that played at the Township were James Brown, Swingin' Medallions, Rob Thomas, Jeezy, Band of Horses, and Needtobreathe.

https://www.setlist.fm/search?page=5&query=Township+Auditorium&venue=73d626c9

Pink Floyd '72 tour: Dark Side of the Moon Tour
Springsteen '78 tour: Darkness Tour
The Jacksons '79 tour: Destiny World Tour
Rise Against 2012 tour: Endgame Tour

The facility is owned and operated by Richland County, with currently Aundrai Holloman serving as Executive Director and Andrew Horne serving as the Assistant Executive Director. Staff also includes Bo Abernethy Box Office Manager, Tresha Clark Marketing Manager, Trip Bradley Event Manager and Melanie Sims as Business Manager.

References

African-American history of South Carolina
Event venues on the National Register of Historic Places in South Carolina
Georgian Revival architecture in South Carolina
Buildings and structures completed in 1930
Buildings and structures in Columbia, South Carolina
National Register of Historic Places in Columbia, South Carolina